Huehuecuetzpalli mixtecus is an extinct lizard from the Early Cretaceous (specifically the middle to late Aptian stage) Tlayúa Formation in Tepexi de Rodríguez, Central Mexico. Although it is not the oldest known lizard, Huehuecuetzpalli may be amongst the most basal members of Squamata (the group that includes lizards and snakes), making it an important taxon in understanding the origins of squamates.

The generic name comes from the Nahuatl words huehuetl ("the ancient") and cuetzpalli ("lizard"), while the specific name refers to the La Mixteca region.

Description 
Unique characteristics (autapomorphies) of Huehuecuetzpalli include a long pair of premaxilla bones at the tip of the upper jaw that contributes to an elongated snout and the apparent retraction of the external nares or nostril openings. At the top of the skull, a small rounded postfrontal and a hole called the parietal foramen between the junction of the frontal bone and the parietal bone (the frontoparietal suture) suggest affinities with iguanians, but the retention of divided premaxillae, amphicoelous vertebrae (vertebrae that are concave at both ends), thoracolumbar intercentra (bones between the vertebrae of the back), an entepicondylar foramen in the humerus (upper arm bone), and a second distal tarsal bone in the foot supports the hypothesis that Huehuecuetzpalli is a basal squamate. A 2021 study suggested that Huehuecuetzpalli was bipedal.

Taxonomy 
Huehuecuetzpalli has been suggested to be either a basal squamate or an iguanian. The most parsimonious tree recovered by Reynoso (1998), seen below, recovers it as the outgroup of crown-group squamates: 

Its position as a stem-group squamate has been supported by subsequent studies.

References 

Cretaceous lizards
Reptilia incertae sedis
Reptiles described in 1998
Fossil taxa described in 1998
Fossils of Mexico
Prehistoric reptile genera